El Número Uno ("The number one") is a Salvadoran television show based on the Spanish format of the same name created by Gestmusic Endemol and Antena 3. It airs on Telecorporación Salvadoreña's Canal 2, and is hosted by Mónica Casamiquela.

History
In early 2013, it was confirmed that Telecorporación Salvadoreña had acquired the rights to adapt El Número Uno, the Spanish format created by Antena 3 and later purchased by Endemol, in El Salvador, becoming the first country in Latin America to have its own version of the show. The start of the production was officially confirmed in a press conference in July 2013.

Production
El Número Uno became the most ambitious project in the history of TCS, and to produce it a new studio, known as "Foro 5", was built and added to the television complex of TCS. The first season started on September 15, 2013, on TCS' Canal 2.

Season 1 (2013)
The first season ran from September 15 to December 8, 2013, and featured a panel of judges composed of Álvaro Torres, Gerardo Parker, Pamela Robin, Arquímedes Reyes and Lucía Parker.

List of contestants

Weekly stats chart

KEY:
 The contestant had already been eliminated
 The contestant was selected for the Duel
 The contestant took part in the Duel and was eliminated by the judges
 The contestant took part in the Duel and was saved by the judges
 The contestant was eliminated in week 1 after not being selected by any judge
 The contestant was picked directly from his group to qualify for the competition
 The contestant was selected by the judges to qualify for the competition
 The contestant was selected by the viewers' votes to qualify for the competition
 The contestant won the weekly challenge and became automatically armored or was the first to be armored by any of the judges
 The contestant was armored by the judges
 The contestant was saved by the viewers' votes

Season 2 (2014)
The second season ran from September 7 to November 30, 2014. None of the judges from season 1 returned to the show, and the new panel featured Jhosse Lora, Andrea Cardenal, Alex Oviedo, Marinella Arrué and Rafael Oviedo.

List of contestants

Weekly stats chart

KEY:
 The contestant had already been eliminated
 The contestant was selected for the Duel
 The contestant took part in the Duel and was eliminated by the judges
 The contestant took part in the Duel and was saved by the judges
 The contestant was eliminated in week 1 after not being selected by any judge
 The contestant was picked directly from his group to qualify for the competition
 The contestant was selected by the judges to qualify for the competition
 The contestant was selected by the viewers' votes to qualify for the competition
 The contestant won the weekly challenge and became automatically armored or was the first to be armored by any of the judges
 The contestant was armored by the judges
 The contestant was saved by the viewers' votes

Season 3 (2015)
The show is slated to return on September 6, 2015, for a third and final season. Gerardo Parker, Juan Manuel Bolaños, Rocío Cáceres, Marinella Arrué and Rafael Alfaro will form the panel of judges.

References

External links
Official website
Official Facebook page

Salvadoran television series
2013 Salvadoran television series debuts
2010s Salvadoran television series
Telecorporación Salvadoreña original programming